is a 1989 Japanese animated fantasy film written, produced, and directed by Hayao Miyazaki, adapted from the 1985 novel Kiki's Delivery Service by Eiko Kadono. It was animated by Studio Ghibli for Tokuma Shoten, Yamato Transport (which licensed the trademark  for the film) and the Nippon Television Network. It stars the voices of Minami Takayama, Rei Sakuma and Kappei Yamaguchi. The story follows Kiki (Takayama), a young witch who moves to a new town and uses her flying ability to earn a living. According to Miyazaki, the movie portrays the gulf between independence and reliance in teenage Japanese girls.

Kiki's Delivery Service was released in Japan on July 29, 1989 by the Toei Company, and won the Animage Anime Grand Prix prize. It was the first film released under a 15-year distribution partnership between The Walt Disney Company and Studio Ghibli. Walt Disney Pictures produced an English dub in 1997, which premiered in United States theaters at the Seattle International Film Festival on May 23, 1998. It was released on home video in the U.S. and Canada on September 1, 1998.

Plot

Thirteen-year-old trainee witch Kiki leaves home with her talking black cat Jiji. She flies on her broomstick to the port city of Koriko. While trying to find somewhere to live, Kiki is pursued by Tombo, a geeky boy obsessed with aviation who admires her flying ability.

In exchange for accommodation, Kiki helps Osono, the kindly owner of a bakery. She opens a business delivering goods by broomstick - the "Witch Delivery Service". Her first delivery goes badly; she is caught in wind and loses the black cat toy she is supposed to deliver. Jiji pretends to be the toy until Kiki can retrieve the real item. She finds it in the home of a young painter, Ursula, who repairs and returns it to Kiki so she can complete the delivery and rescue Jiji.

Kiki accepts a party invitation from Tombo, but is delayed by her work and, exhausted, falls ill. When she recovers, Osono clandestinely arranges for Kiki to see Tombo again by assigning her a delivery addressed to him. After Kiki apologizes for missing the party, Tombo takes her for a test ride on the flying machine he is working on fashioned from a bicycle. Kiki warms to Tombo but is intimidated by his friends, and walks home.

Kiki becomes depressed and discovers she can no longer understand Jiji, who has befriended a pretty white cat. She has also lost her flying ability and is forced to suspend her delivery business. Kiki has a surprise visit from Ursula, who determines that Kiki's crisis is a form of artist's block. Ursula suggests that if Kiki can find a new purpose, she will regain her powers.

While Kiki is visiting a customer, she witnesses an airship accident on television. A strong gust leaves Tombo hanging in mid-air. Kiki regains her flying power and manages to rescue him. She regains her confidence, resumes her delivery service, and writes a letter home saying that she and Jiji are happy.

Voice cast

Themes and analysis

A major theme of the film is maturity. After leaving her parents who are supportive of her independence, Kiki has to face problems common to adolescence such as finding a job, seeking acceptance, and taking care of herself. The concept of vulnerability is also examined closely in the film. Critic Mark Schilling notes a scene during Kiki's first night away from home where Kiki rushes back to her room and slams the door behind her to avoid being spotted by Fukuo. Fukuo, however, steps outside simply to stretch his arms, and Kiki's bizarrely shy behavior "expresses [her] youth, vulnerability, and isolation."

Another theme is the transition from traditional to contemporary. Kiki is shown to balance both of these qualities. For instance, Kiki observes the tradition of witches wearing black, but adorns her hair with a bright red bow. Kiki also engages in other traditional methods, such as baking with a wood-burning stove and flying her mother's old broom.

Kiki's loss of her witch powers is considered the worst crisis she has to face during the film. Her loss of flight reflects the harm dealt to Kiki by her own self-doubts. This hardship causes Kiki to realize that being vulnerable does not always lead to failure and can help her learn valuable lessons to better understand herself. Jiji had served as the wiser voice (imaginary companion) to Kiki, and she stopped being able to understand him the moment she struggles with self-doubt. At the end of the film when Kiki overcomes her personal challenges, she is still unable to understand Jiji, signifying her newfound maturity and wisdom.

In relation to Kiki's portrayal as a witch, some have drawn comparisons to historical or contemporary views on witches and witchcraft. The film incorporates some conventions from fairy-tales such as a black cat companion for Kiki, Kiki's use of a broom for flight, and her black dress. While girls with magical powers are common in Japanese television, Miyazaki noted that, "the witchcraft has always merely been the means to fulfill the dreams of young girls. They have always become idols with no difficulties." In contrast, Kiki cannot use her powers as a means of wish fulfillment.

Kiki has also been compared to other characters in Miyazaki's films. While there are overt differences in demeanor between Kiki and San from Princess Mononoke, a character who is motivated by anger, both characters take control over their own lives. This theme of remarkable independence is also seen in Miyazaki's earlier works, such as in Nausicaä in Nausicaä of the Valley of the Wind. Kiki is also compared to Chihiro of Spirited Away as they are both young girls attempting to seek independence without being rebellious. Both Chihiro and Kiki develop their independence with the help of their friends.

Production
In 1987, Group Fudosha asked Kadono's publishers for the rights to adapt Kadono's novel into a feature film directed by either Hayao Miyazaki or Isao Takahata of Studio Ghibli. However, both of the chosen directors were busy, working on My Neighbor Totoro and Grave of the Fireflies respectively. Miyazaki accepted the role of producer while the studio continued to search for a director. Near the end of  Totoros production, members of Studio Ghibli were being recruited as senior staff for Kiki's Delivery Service. The character design position was given to Katsuya Kondo, who was working with Miyazaki on Totoro. Hiroshi Ohno, who would later work on projects such as Jin-Roh, was hired as art director at the request of Kazuo Oga.

Miyazaki chose Sunao Katabuchi as director. Katabuchi had worked with Miyazaki on Sherlock Hound; Kiki's Delivery Service would be his directorial debut. Studio Ghibli hired Nobuyuki Isshiki as script writer, but Miyazaki was dissatisfied by the first draft, finding it dry and too divergent from his own vision of the film. Since the novel was based in a fictional country in northern Europe, Miyazaki and the senior staff went to research landscapes and other elements of the setting. Their main stops were Stockholm and Visby on the Swedish island of Gotland.

Upon their return to Japan, Miyazaki and the creative team worked on conceptual art and character designs. Miyazaki began significantly modifying the story, creating new ideas and changing existing ones. Majo no Takkyūbin, the original children's book by Kadono that the movie was based on, is very different from Miyazaki's finished film.  Kadono's novel is more episodic, consisting of small stories about various people and incidents Kiki encounters while making deliveries. Kiki overcomes many challenges in the novel based on "her good heart" and consequently expands her circle of friends. She faces no particular traumas or crises. Many of the more dramatic elements, such as Kiki gets attacked by many crows, losing her powers or the airship incident at the film's climax, are not present in the original story. In order to more clearly illustrate the themes of struggling with independence and growing up in the film, Miyazaki intended to have Kiki face tougher challenges and create a more potent sense of loneliness. One such challenge is Kiki's sudden loss of ability to fly. This event is only loosely paralleled in the novel, in which Kiki's broom breaks and merely requires her to fix it. Miyazaki remarked, "As movies always create a more realistic feeling, Kiki will suffer stronger setbacks and loneliness than in the original". Kadono was unhappy with the changes made between the book and film, to the point that the project was in danger of being shelved at the screenplay stage. Miyazaki and Toshio Suzuki, the producer of Ghibli, went to the author's home and invited her to the film's studio. After her visit to the studio, Kadono decided to let the project continue.

Miyazaki finished the rough draft of the screenplay in June 1988 and presented it in July 1988. It was at this time that Miyazaki revealed that he had decided to direct the film, because he had influenced the project so much. Kiki's Delivery Service was originally intended to be a 60-minute special, but expanded into a feature film running 102 minutes after Miyazaki completed storyboarding and scripting it.

The company not only approved the use of its trademark, though its permission was not required under Japanese trademark laws, but also enthusiastically sponsored the film, as the company uses a stylized depiction of a black cat carrying her kitten as its corporate logo.

Music

As with Hayao Miyazaki's other films, Joe Hisaishi composed the soundtrack for this film. Disney's English dub of the film also includes new songs in the soundtrack. These include two original songs written and performed by Sydney Forest: "Soaring" and "I'm Gonna Fly", which respectively replaced "Message of Rouge" and "Wrapped in Kindness" as the opening and ending themes. Paul Chihara also composed new instrumental pieces over scenes that were originally silent in the Japanese version, such as a rendition of In the Hall of the Mountain King.

Release
The first official English dub of Kiki's Delivery Service was produced by Carl Macek of Streamline Pictures at the request of Tokuma Shoten for Japan Airlines' international flights. Kiki is portrayed by voice actress Lisa Michelson, who voices Satsuki in the Streamline Dub of My Neighbor Totoro. This dub is available only in the Ghibli Laserdisc Box Set.

Kirsten Dunst voices Kiki in Disney's 1997 English dub, released in 1998. This dub was also one of Canadian-American comedian and actor Phil Hartman's last voice-acting performances (as Jiji) as he died on May 28, 1998. The dub is therefore dedicated to his memory. The Disney English dub of Kiki's Delivery Service premiered at the Seattle International Film Festival on May 23, 1998. It was released to VHS on September 1, 1998. A few weeks later, Disney released another VHS of the movie, this time with the original Japanese soundtrack and with both English and Japanese subtitles. A bilingual Laserdisc version also became available at this time, containing English PCM Stereo and Dolby Digital 5.1 tracks and Japanese mono audio on the analog left channel. The Region 1 DVD was released on April 15, 2003 alongside the releases of Spirited Away and Castle in the Sky. It was again reissued on Region 1 DVD in March 2010 along with My Neighbor Totoro and Castle in the Sky as a tribute to the home release of Ponyo, with this version altered from the original English dub. Two years later, on 1 July 2013, StudioCanal released a  Blu-ray, followed by a Grave of the Fireflies release except in that same format, only in the United Kingdom. Walt Disney Studios Home Entertainment released Kiki's Delivery Service on Blu-ray Disc on November 18, 2014. GKIDS re-issued the film on Blu-ray and DVD on October 17, 2017.

Differences between versions

Disney's English dub of Kiki's Delivery Service contained some changes, which have been described as "pragmatic". The changes were approved by Miyazaki and Studio Ghibli. There are a number of additions and embellishments to the film's musical score, and several lavish sound effects over sections that are silent in the Japanese original. The extra pieces of music, composed by Paul Chihara, range from soft piano music to a string-plucked rendition of Edvard Grieg's In the Hall of the Mountain King.
The original opening and ending theme songs are replaced by two new songs, "Soaring" and "I'm Gonna Fly". Both are written and performed for the English dub by Sydney Forest.

The depiction of the cat, Jiji, is changed significantly in the Disney version. In the Japanese version Jiji is voiced by Rei Sakuma, while in the English version Jiji is voiced by comedian Phil Hartman. In Japanese culture, cats are usually depicted with feminine voices, whereas in American culture their voices are more gender-specific. A number of Hartman's lines exist where Jiji simply says nothing in the original. Jiji's personality is notably different between the two versions, showing a more cynical and sarcastic attitude in the Disney English version as opposed to cautious and conscientious in the original Japanese. In the original Japanese script, Kiki loses her ability to communicate with Jiji permanently, but the American version adds a line that implies that she is once again able to understand him at the end of the film. Miyazaki has said that Jiji is the immature side of Kiki, and this implies that Kiki, by the end of the original Japanese version, has matured beyond talking to her cat. More minor changes to appeal to the different teenage habits of the day include Kiki drinking hot chocolate instead of coffee and referring to "cute boys" instead of to "the disco".

However, when Disney re-released the film on DVD in 2010, several elements of the English dub were changed, reverting more towards the original Japanese version. Hartman's ad-libbed lines as Jiji were removed, and Forest's opening and ending songs were replaced with Arai's original Japanese opening and ending songs. Additionally, Jiji does not talk again at the end, implying that Kiki never regains the ability to talk to him, and many of the sound effects added to the original English version have been removed. The English subtitled script used for the original VHS subbed release and the later DVD release more closely adheres to the Japanese script, but still contains a few alterations. Tokuma mistakenly believed the Streamline dub was an accurate translation of the film and offered it to Disney to use as subtitles. As a result, several additions from the dub appear in the subtitles regardless of whether or not they are present in the film. In Spain, Kiki was renamed "Nicky" because in Castilian Spanish the phonetically similar "quiqui" is commonly used in the slang expression "echar un quiqui", which means "to have intercourse". The film was re-titled Nicky la aprendiz de bruja (Nicky the Apprentice Witch).

Box office 
Kiki's Delivery Service premiered on July 29, 1989 in Japanese theaters. The film was 1989's highest-grossing film in Japan. It also grossed  in Hong Kong upon release there in 1990. Later re-releases and international releases between 2004 and 2020 grossed US$10,276,218 worldwide, adding up to  grossed worldwide .

Home media 
The film became available on home video in the United States in 1994. Buena Vista Home Video's VHS release in 1998 became the 8th most-rented title at Blockbuster stores during its first week of availability. This video release sold over a million copies.

The Japanese DVD was the best-selling anime DVD for February 7, 2001.

In the United Kingdom, it was 2018's seventh best-selling foreign language film on home video, and 2019's fifth best-selling foreign language film (below four other Japanese films, including three Miyazaki anime films).

Reception
At the review aggregator website Rotten Tomatoes, 98% of 42 reviews are positive for Kiki's Delivery Service, and the average rating is 8.1/10. The critics consensus reads, "Kiki's Delivery Service is a heartwarming, gorgeously-rendered tale of a young witch discovering her place in the world." Metacritic, another aggregator, collected 15 reviews and calculated an average rating of 83 out of 100, signifying "universal acclaim." On September 4, 1998, Entertainment Weekly rated it as Video of the Year, and on September 12, 1998, it was the first video release to be reviewed as a normal film on Siskel and Ebert rather than on the "Video Pick of the Week" section. Gene Siskel of the Chicago Tribune and Roger Ebert of the Chicago Sun-Times gave it "two thumbs up" and Ebert went on to rank it as one of the best animated films released in the U.S. in 1998. The film ranked #12 on Wizard's Anime Magazine's list of the "Top 50 Anime released in North America". Other reviews were very positive as well. Andrew Johnston wrote in Time Out New York: "Although the story has a clear moral about learning to develop self-confidence, Kiki is never preachy. The story is given time to unfold at a natural pace..., which contributes greatly to the sense of depth it conveys."

Accolades

Adaptations

Manga
A manga book series using stills from the film was published in Japan by Tokuma Shoten. An English translation was published in 2006 by Viz Media, in 4 volumes.

Musical
A musical based on the film ran at the Southwark Playhouse in the UK from December 8, 2016 to January 8, 2017. It was adapted by Jessica Sian and directed by Katie Hewitt.

References

Bibliography

External links
 
 Kiki's Delivery Service page at Nausicaa.net
 
 
 
 
 
 Violation of Agreement with added Dialog and Sound Effects.

1989 films
1989 anime films
1980s adventure films
1989 fantasy films
1980s Japanese-language films
1980s road movies
Animated coming-of-age films
Animated films based on children's books
1980s children's fantasy films
Coming-of-age anime and manga
Drama anime and manga
Films scored by Joe Hisaishi
Films based on fantasy novels
Films based on Japanese novels
Films directed by Hayao Miyazaki
Gallop (studio)
Japanese animated fantasy films
Japanese coming-of-age films
Studio Ghibli animated films
Films about witchcraft
Witchcraft in anime and manga
Japanese magical girl films
1980s children's animated films